Central Square is a village in Oswego County, New York, United States. The population was 1,848 at the 2010 census.

The Village of Central Square is located in the southern part of the Town of Hastings on Route 49 and U.S. Route 11. The village is west of Interstate 81. The village is northwest of Oneida Lake.

History 
The site was the crossing of Native American trails that became crossroads of the early settlers. Central Square was first called "Loomis Corners" after Chester Loomis, who built a hotel there. Later, the community also became a railroad junction.

The village was incorporated in 1890.

The central part of the village was devastated by a fire in 1929.

Geography
Central Square is located at  (43.284082, -76.146004).

The Central Square School District is a part of the village of Central Square.

Demographics

At the 2000 census there were 1,646 people, 752 households, and 430 families in the village. The population density was 888.2 people per square mile (343.5/km). There were 796 housing units at an average density of 429.5 per square mile (166.1/km).  The racial makeup of the village was 98.06% White, 0.61% African American, 0.06% Native American, 0.73% Asian, 0.12% from other races, and 0.43% from two or more races. Hispanic or Latino of any race were 0.91%.

Of the 752 households 26.9% had children under the age of 18 living with them, 43.2% were married couples living together, 10.5% had a female householder with no husband present, and 42.7% were non-families. 36.4% of households were one person and 18.9% were one person aged 65 or older. The average household size was 2.19 and the average family size was 2.84.

The age distribution was 22.3% under the age of 18, 8.3% from 18 to 24, 27.6% from 25 to 44, 22.7% from 45 to 64, and 19.1% 65 or older. The median age was 39 years. For every 100 females, there were 84.9 males. For every 100 females age 18 and over, there were 83.0 males.

The median household income was $31,875 and the median family income  was $45,441. Males had a median income of $34,583 versus $25,078 for females. The per capita income for the village was $20,946. About 8.6% of families and 12.5% of the population were below the poverty line, including 13.7% of those under age 18 and 12.6% of those age 65 or over.

References

External links
 Village of Central Square, New York homepage

Villages in New York (state)
Syracuse metropolitan area
Villages in Oswego County, New York